Vagharshak (in Western Armenian Vagharshag) (in Armenian Վաղարշակ) is an Armenian given name. It may refer to:

Vagharshak Grigoryan (1917-1980), Armenian doctor of medicine and professor
Vagharshak Harutiunyan (born 1956), Armenian politician and minister
Vagharshak Kosyan, Armenian-Abkhazian military leader and politician

See also
Arshak III (fl. 4th century – died 387), also known as Arshak III-Vagharshak, Arsaces III, Arsak III, Armenian prince who served as a Roman client king of Arsacid Armenia from 378 until 387.

Armenian masculine given names